A wheatsheaf is a sheaf of wheat

The name may also refer to:
The Wheatsheaf, Fitzrovia, a public house in Camden, London
The Wheatsheaf, St Helens, a public house in Merseyside, England
The Wheatsheaf, Southwark, a public house in London
The Wheatsheaf, Camberley, a public house in Surrey
Druid Park, formally called Wheatsheaf Ground, Gosforth rugby union stadium near Newcastle-on-Tyne, England
Wheatsheaf Junction, a rail junction on the Wheatsheaf branch line, named after The Wheatsheaf public house near Wrexham, Wales
Wheatsheaf Park (football stadium), sometimes called the Wheatsheaf, Staines Town F.C. football ground     
The Wheatsheaf, a name for The Wheatsheaf Players Co-Operative Theatre in Coventry, England
Wallaroo Wheatsheaf, later just the Wheatsheaf, a newspaper published in Wallaroo, South Australia from 1911 to 1921